Valentina Dimitrova (May 4, 1956 – November 2, 2014) was a heptathlete who competed for Bulgaria during her career. She won the gold medal at the 1977 Summer Universiade. Dimitrova set her personal best (6440 points) in the heptathlon on 29 May 1983 at a meet in Götzis.

Achievements

References
trackfield.brinkster
Valentina Dimitrova's obituary

1956 births
2014 deaths
Bulgarian pentathletes
Bulgarian heptathletes
Athletes (track and field) at the 1980 Summer Olympics
Olympic athletes of Bulgaria
Universiade medalists in athletics (track and field)
Universiade gold medalists for Bulgaria